The Days of Swiss Linguistics (DSL) (German: Tage der Schweizer Linguistik (TSL), French: Journées de linguistique suisse (JLS), Italian: Giornate della linguistica svizzere (GLS)) is a series of linguistics conferences held biennially at one of the Swiss universities on behalf of the Swiss Linguistics Society (SSG). It is an international conference for researchers from Switzerland, Europe and beyond. So far, 11 editions of the conference have been carried out, the next conference will take place in 2022 at Université de Lausanne.

See also
 List of linguistics conferences

References

Linguistics conferences